Tuban may refer to:
Indonesia
 Tuban, Tuban Regency, East Java
 Tuban, Kuta, Badung Regency, Bali
 Tuban Regency, East Java

Yemen
 Tuban District